The Labor and Employment Relations Association (LERA), was founded in 1947 as the Industrial Relations Research Association. LERA is an organization for professionals in industrial relations and human resources. Headquartered at the School of Labor and Employment Relations at the University of Illinois at Urbana–Champaign, the organization has more than 3,000 members at the national level and in its local chapters. LERA is a non-profit, non-partisan organization that draws its members from the ranks of academia, management, labor and "neutrals" (arbitrators and mediators).

LERA's constituencies are professionals in the areas of academic research and education, compensation and benefits, human resources, labor and employment law, labor and management resources, labor markets and economics, public policy, training and development, and union administration and organizing. The executive director of LERA is Emily Smith. Past presidents of LERA include John T. Dunlop, George Shultz, and Ray Marshall, all of whom went on to serve as U.S. Secretary of Labor.

LERA encourages research into all areas of the field of labor, employment, the workplace, employer/employee organization, employment and labor relations, human resources, labor markets, income security, and the international dimensions of all of these areas. The organization takes a multi-disciplinarian approach and includes scholars from various disciplines including industrial relations, history, economics, political science, psychology, sociology, law, management, labor studies, and others.

LERA promotes full discussion and exchange of ideas between and among all of its constituencies—academic, labor, management, neutral, and government—on the planning, development and results of research in these fields, as well as its useful application in both practice and policy.

LERA is also disseminates the latest research, challenges in the field, and best practices to researchers, practitioners, and the public, by holding meetings, producing materials and publications.

The association assumes no partisan position on questions of policy in these fields, but is an open forum respecting all opinions and perspectives. The association supports fundamental worker and human rights in the workplace and supports rights of the employees, employers, and their organizations to organize.

History
The organization was founded as the Industrial Relations Research Association, by labor economists in the post World War II era, who found a need to expand upon discussions taking place surrounding workplace issues. For the first 52 years of the organization, the IRRA was headquartered at the University of Wisconsin, Madison. In 1999, the organization moved its headquarters to the campus of the University of Illinois at Urbana-Champaign, and Paula Wells became the executive director. The organization was invited to make the Institute of Labor and Industrial Relations at the University of Illinois its home base, which later became known as the School of Labor and Employment Relations in 2006, with LERA past President Joel Cutcher-Gershenfeld as its first dean. LERA itself changed its own name to the Labor and Employment Relations Association in 2005, in response to many changes taking place in the field, transitioning from industrial relations to the field of labor and employment relations.

Past presidents
 1948   Edwin E. Witte, University of Wisconsin
 1949   Sumner H. Slichter, Harvard University
 1950   George W. Taylor, University of Pennsylvania
 1951   William M. Leiserson, Johns Hopkins University
 1952   J. Douglas Brown, Princeton University
 1953   Ewan Clague, U.S. Department of Labor
 1954   Clark Kerr, University of California
 1955   Lloyd G. Reynolds, Yale University
 1956   Richard A. Lester, Princeton University
 1957   Dale Yoder, University of Minnesota
 1958   E. Wight Bakke, Yale University
 1959   William Haber, University of Michigan
 1960   John T. Dunlop, Harvard University
 1961   Philip Taft, Brown University
 1962   Charles A. Myers, MIT
 1963   William F. Whyte, Cornell University
 1964   Solomon Barkin, Textile Workers of America
 1965   Edwin Young, University of Wisconsin
 1966   Arthur M. Ross, University of California
 1967   Neil W. Chamberlain, Columbia University
 1968   George P. Shultz, University of Chicago
 1969   Frederick H. Harbison, Princeton University
 1970   Douglass V. Brown, MIT
 1971   George H. Hildebrand, U.S. Department of Labor
 1972   Benjamin Aaron, UCLA
 1973   Douglas H. Soutar, Am. Smelting & Refining Co.
 1974   Nathaniel Goldfinger, AFL-CIO
 1975   Gerald G. Somers, University of Wisconsin
 1976   Irving Bernstein, UCLA
 1977   F. Ray Marshall, University of Texas
 1978   Charles C. Killingsworth, Michigan State University.
 1979   Jerome M. Rosow, Work in America Institute
 1980   Jack Barbash, University of Wisconsin
 1980   Rudolph A. Oswald, AFL-CIO
 1982   Milton Derber, University of Illinois
 1983   Jack Stieber, Michigan State University
 1984   Wayne L. Horvitz, Consultant, Washington, D.C.
 1985   Everett M. Kassalow, University of Wisconsin
 1986   Lloyd Ulman, University of California-Berkeley
 1987   Michael H. Moskow, Premark International
 1988   Phyllis A. Wallace, MIT
 1989   Joyce D. Miller, ACTWU
 1990   Robert B. McKersie, MIT
 1991   James L. Stern, University of Wisconsin-Madison
 1992   Ernest J. Savoie, Ford Motor Company
 1993   George Strauss, University of California-Berkeley
 1994   Lynn R. Williams, United Steelworkers of America
 1995   Walter J. Gershenfeld, Arbitrator, Flourtown, PA
 1996   Hoyt N. Wheeler, University of South Carolina
 1997   Francine Blau, Cornell University 
 1998   F. Donal O'Brien, Arbitrator/Mediator
 1999   Thomas A. Kochan, MIT
 2000   Sheldon Friedman, AFL-CIO
 2001   Magdalena Jacobsen, FMCS
 2002   John F. Burton Jr., Rutgers University
 2003   Paula Voos, Rutgers University
 2004   Marlene K. Heyser, Workplace Law Strategies
 2005   Stephen Sleigh, IAMAW
 2006   David Lipsky, Cornell University
 2007   Eileen B. Hoffman, Federal Mediation and Conciliation Service
 2008   Anthony Oliver Jr., Parker Milliken, Clark O'Hara & Samuelian
 2009   Joel Cutcher-Gershenfeld, University of Illinois at Urbana-Champaign
 2010   Eileen Appelbaum, Rutgers University
 2011   Gordon Pavy, AFL-CIO
 2012–13   David Lewin, UCLA
 2014   Martin Mulloy, Ford Motor CO.
 2015   Lisa M. Lynch, Brandeis University
 2016   Bonnie Prouty Castry, Arbitrator/Mediator
 2017   Janice Bellace, University of Pennsylvania
 2018   Harry C. Katz, Cornell University
 2019   Kris Rondeau, AFSCME
 2020   Dennis Dabney, Kaiser Permanente
 2021   Adrienne Eaton, Rutgers University

Editors
 Milton Derber, University of Illinois, 1948–50
 L. Reed Tripp, University of Wisconsin, 1951–56
 Gerald G. Somers, University of Wisconsin, 1957–74
 Barbara D. Dennis and James L. Stern, Univ. of Wis., 1975–77
 Barbara D. Dennis, University of Wisconsin, 1977–89
 John F. Burton Jr., Rutgers University, 1989–94
 Paula B. Voos, University of Wisconsin-Madison, 1994–2002
 Adrienne Eaton, Rutgers University, 2003–2009
 Françoise Carré and Christian Weller, University of Massachusetts Boston, 2010-2014
 Ariel Avgar, Cornell University, 2015-2019
 Ryan Lamare, University of Illinois, 2020−

Secretary-treasurers
 William H. McPherson, University of Illinois, 1948–50
 Robben W. Fleming, University of Wisconsin, 1951–53
 Edwin Young, University of Wisconsin, 1954–62
 David B. Johnson, University of Wisconsin, 1963–72
 James L. Stern (Treas.), UW-Madison, 1968–69
 Richard U. Miller, UW-Madison, 1973–77
 David R. Zimmerman, UW-Madison, 1978–1999
 Peter Feuille, University of Illinois at Urbana-Champaign, 2000–2014
 Craig Olson, University of Illinois at Urbana-Champaign, 2015–2017
 Ryan Lamare, University of Illinois at Urbana-Champaign, 2018–2019
 Andrew Weaver, University of Illinois at Urbana-Champaign, 2020-

Founding members
 Vincent W. Bladen, University of Toronto
 Eveline M. Burns, Columbia University
 Ewan Clague, U.S. Department of Labor
 Milton Derber, University of Illinois
 William Haber, University of Michigan
 Frederick H. Harbison, University of Chicago
 Vernon H. Jensen, Cornell University
 Clark Kerr, University of California-Berkeley
 Richard A. Lester, Princeton University
 William H. McPherson, University of Illinois
 C. Wright Mills, Columbia University
 Donald G. Paterson, University of Minnesota
 Sumner H. Slichter, Harvard University
 Sterling D. Spero, New York University
 George W. Taylor, University of Pennsylvania
 Francis Tyson, University of Pittsburgh
 William F. Whyte, University of Chicago
 W. Willard Wirtz, Northwestern University
 Edwin E. Witte, University of Wisconsin
 Harry D. Wolf, University of North Carolina
 Dale Yoder, University of Minnesota

Charter members (affiliation at time became member)
 Benjamin Aaron, Arbitrator, Los Angeles
 Leonard P. Adams, Cornell University
 Gabriel N. Alexander, Arbitrator, Detroit
 (Mrs.) Jack Barbash, Amalgamated Meat Cutters and Butcherworkmen of NA
 Solomon Barkin, Textile Workers
 Irving Bernstein, UCLA
 Seymour Brandwein, Bureau of National Affairs
 George W. Brooks, Washington, DC
 Neil W. Chamberlain, Yale University
 Jesse C. Clamp Jr., Florida State University
 Bernard Cushman, Labor Burea of Middle West
 Edward L. Cushman, Wayne University
 G. Allan Dash Jr., Arbitrator, Philadelphia
 John T. Dunlop, Harvard University
 Milton T. Edelman, University of Illinois
 Marten S. Estey, Cornell University
 Tracy H. Ferguson, Esq., Syracuse
 Joseph P. Goldberg, Jt. Congressional Comm. on Labor-Mgmt. Relations
 Lois S. Gray, Cornell University
 Einar J. Hardin, University of Minnesota
 James J. Healy, Harvard University
 Peter Henle, American Federation of Labor
 Morris A. Horowitz, University of Illinois
 Harriet D. Hudson, University of Illinois
 Arthur T. Jacobs, USNA, New York
 Howard W. Johnson, University of Chicago
 Jacob J. Kaufman, University of Toledo
 Clark Kerr, University of California-Berkeley
 Charles C. Killingsworth, Michigan State College
 Forrest H. Kirkpatrick, Bethany College
 Milton R. Konvitz, Cornell University
 Richard A. Lester, Princeton University
 Solomon B. Levine, University of Illinois
 Kenneth M. McCaffree, University of Washington
 Frederic Meyers, University of Texas
 James G. Miller, Cornell University
 John W. Miller Jr., Ford Motor Co.
 Charles A. Myers, Massachusetts Institute of Technology
 Maurice F. Neufeld, Cornell University
 Herbert R. Northrup, Columbia University
 Lloyd G. Reynolds, Yale University
 Milton Rubin, War Labor Board
 Stanley H. Ruttenberg, Congress of Indus. Organizations
 Sidney W. Salsburg, University of Wisconsin
 Arthur W. Saltzman, Syracuse University
 Richard Scheuch, Princeton University
 Rosalind S. Schulman, Indus. Union of Marine and Shipbuilding Workers-CIO
 Boaz Siegel, Wayne University
 Ruth S. Spitz, Ohio State University
 Arthur Stark, New York State Board of Mediation
 Jack Stieber, United Steelworkers of America
 Ralph I. Thayer, Washington State College
 Lloyd Ulman, Harvard University
 Martin Wagner, Louisville Labor-Mgmt. Comm.
 Morris Weisz, Bureau of Labor Statistics
 Donald J. White, Boston College
 William F. Whyte, Cornell University
 John P. Windmuller, Cornell University
 Fred Witney, Indiana University
 David A. Wolff, Arbitrator, Ann Arbor
 Henry S. Woodbridge, American Optical Co.
 David Ziskind, Esq., Los Angeles

Employment Policy Research Network
At the 2011 January annual meeting, LERA launched the Employment Policy Research Network (EPRN). It originally consisted of about 100 researchers (economists; management, human resources, and labor relations researchers; attorneys, historians and sociologists) from 30 universities, including California-Berkeley, Columbia, Cornell, Illinois, Massachusetts (several campuses), MIT, Michigan, Michigan State, Northeastern, Rutgers, Stanford and UCLA, as well as universities in Canada and the United Kingdom. In March, 2011, the first cohort of doctoral students from MIT and Cornell joined EPRN as graduate student researchers who are sponsored by EPRN researchers. As of May 1, 2011, there were 125 EPRN researchers from 50 universities.

EPRN received start-up funding from the Rockefeller Foundation and Russell Sage Foundation. The EPRN principal investigator is Thomas A. Kochan, George Maverick Bunker Professor of Management at MIT's Sloan School of Management and co-director of both the MIT Workplace Center and the Institute for Work and Employment Research.

EPRN is an employment research repository and virtual collaboration space whose mission is to replace ideology and partisan rhetoric with facts and objective, evidence-based research in discussions of U.S. employment, work and labor. EPRN's goal is to provide the data, research, policy proposals and reasoning to improve national and state employment laws, policies and practices. Ultimately, EPRN realizing its mission means to contribute to healthier and more productive lives of American workers and their families, to promote general economic prosperity and to enable the nation to compete successfully in the global economy. Like LERA, its parent organization, EPRN is non-profit and non-partisan.

EPRN divides the large subject of employment and work into 15 topics and research clusters of 20–40 researchers:

 Employment regulations
 Equal employment opportunity
 Globalization, employment and labor Standards
 Immigration
 Industry studies/strategies
 Labor and employment law
 Labor force demographics/supply
 Labor–management relations
 Regional economic development/adjustment
 Skills, work and technology
 Social insurance
 Unemployment – jobs deficit/growth
 Workers' compensation

Publications
LERA publishes a number of research reports and books, as well as an annual research volume, an annual proceedings of LERA meetings, an electronically distributed newsletter, and an online membership directory. It also publishes the biannual journal, Perspectives on Work. The LERA Labor and Employment Law Section publishes a quarterly electronic newsletter as well.

 Perspectives on Work Magazine
 LERA Annual Research Volume
 Proceedings of the Annual Meetings
 LERA eBulletin
 LERA Labor and Employment Law Newsletter (LEL News)

Administration and organization

Administrative staff and directors
 1947–1967: No administrative staff (LERA's Secretary-Treasurer had an administrative assistant.)
 1967–1982: Elizabeth Gulesserian, Executive Assistant to the IRRA
 1982–1999: Kay Hutchinson, Administrator of the IRRA
 1999–2012: Paula D. Wells, Executive Director, IRRA/LERA
 2012–2015: Eric Duchinsky, Executive Director, LERA
 2015–Present: Emily E. Smith, Executive Director, LERA

Membership
LERA organizational members include unions, management schools, universities, academic schools and departments, law firms and institutes. Individual members come from the ranks of academe, labor, management and neutrals. The organization provides professional development for human resource professionals, union members, corporate and non-profit managers; national, state and local government employees; arbitrators and mediators; labor attorneys and others.

LERA meets each year in May/June (LERA Annual Meeting), and participates with 18 sessions (LERA@ASSA Meeting) as part of the Allied Social Science Associations the first week of January each year.

In 2018, LERA held the LERA 70th Annual Meeting, in Baltimore, MD, at the Hilton Baltimore, June 14–17, 2018. Our LERA 71st Annual Meeting, June 13–16, 2019 will take place in Cleveland, Ohio at the Westin Cleveland Downtown.

Awards
LERA offers a number of awards, recognitions and grants each year. Its most prestigious award is the John T. Dunlop Scholar Award. Two Dunlop Scholar Awards are given each year. One goes to an academic who makes the best contribution to international and/or comparative labor and employment research. A second award recognizes an academic for research that addresses an industrial relations/employment problem of national significance in the United States. Other awards include:

 Thomas A. Kochan and Stephen R. Sleigh Best Dissertation Award
 Chapter Merit Awards, Outstanding Chapter, and Chapter Star Awards
 LERA Fellows
 Lifetime Achievement Award
 James G. Scoville Best International Paper Award
 John T. Dunlop Scholar Awards
 LERA Outstanding Practitioner Awards
 Susan C. Eaton Scholar-Practitioner Award
 Susan C. Eaton Scholar-Practitioner Grant
 Kenneth May Media Award
 Myron Taylor Management Award

See also
 List of human resource management associations

References

Professional associations based in the United States
Organizations established in 1947
Organizations based in Illinois
Human resource management associations
1947 establishments in Illinois